Class 38 may refer to:

 German passenger locomotives with a 4-6-0 wheel arrangement operated by the Deutsche Reichsbahn comprising:
 Class 38.0: Bavarian P 3/5 N
 Class 38.2-3: Saxon XII H2
 Class 38.4: Bavarian P 3/5 H
 Class 38.5: JDŽ 109
 Class 38.10-40: Prussian P 8
 Class 38.41: BBÖ 209, JDŽ 03
 Class 38.42-44: ČSD Class 354.4
 Class 38.45-46: PKP Class Ok22
 Class 38.70: Baden IV e
 New South Wales Class 38 locomotive